Petr Velikiy ( – Peter the Great) was an ironclad turret ship built for the Imperial Russian Navy during the 1870s. Her engines and boilers were defective, but were not replaced until 1881. The ship made a cruise to the Mediterranean after they were installed, and before returning to the Baltic Fleet, where she remained for the rest of her career. She did not, like the rest of the Baltic Fleet, participate in the Russo-Turkish War of 1877–1878. Petr Veliky was deemed obsolete by the late 1890s, but she was not ordered to be converted into a gunnery training ship until 1903.

The Russo-Japanese War of 1904–1905 slowed her reconstruction, and the ship was not completed until 1908. She spent most of World War I as a training ship, although she became a depot ship for submarines in 1917. Petr Veliky was in Helsinki in March 1918 when the Treaty of Brest-Litovsk required the Soviets to evacuate their naval base at Helsinki or have their ships interned by newly independent Finland even though the Gulf of Finland was still frozen over. The ship reached Kronstadt in April 1918 and was hulked on 21 May 1921. She remained in service with the Soviets, in various secondary roles, until she was finally stricken from the Navy List in 1959 and subsequently scrapped.

Design and description
Petr Veliky had its genesis in the visit of the American twin-turret monitor  to Kronstadt in August 1866, that inspired Rear Admiral A. A. Popov to submit a preliminary design for a low-freeboard, breastwork monitor with a full suite of sails and masts. He intended the ship to act as a hybrid monitor-cruiser, able to attack enemy shipping and threaten his ports. The design was approved by the Naval Technical Committee, and a detailed design was prepared by September 1867. This was reviewed on 20 February 1868, and the coal supply was ordered to be raised from four to five days' steaming, which forced the design to be revised to accommodate the extra coal. This modified design was approved on 26 January 1869 by the Committee, but more changes were made even after that. In May Popov proposed to add a small superstructure forward of the breastwork to improve seakeeping and overhanging side armor as used on the monitors during the American Civil War.

Construction of the ship, now named Kreiser (Cruiser), began even before the design was approved, but changes to the design continued to be made. The masts and rigging were deleted, presumably shortly after the loss of the British masted turret ship  in a storm on 7 September 1870, although the exact date is not known. The decision between a ram and telescoping spar torpedoes in the ship's bow was not made until November 1870. The visit of the British naval architect Edward Reed in June 1871 prompted changes in the design of the breastwork. Kreiser was renamed Petr Veliky on 11 June 1872, in honor of the bicentennial of Peter the Great's birth.

The ship's hull was subdivided by one centerline longitudinal, nine transverse and two wing watertight bulkheads, and it had a complete double bottom. Although a lively roller, she was considered a passable sea-boat even though water flooded in between the gap between the gun turrets and the deck whenever the sea swept over her forecastle.

Propulsion
Petr Veliky had two three-cylinder horizontal return connecting rod-steam engines, each driving a single propeller.

The machinery was built by the Baird Works for the price of 1,019,000 rubles, but proved to be defective. Inferior metal was used in the boilers and multiple cracks and breaks were found in the piping. Cracks were also found in the engine cylinders that Baird had attempted to patch and then puttied over. Baird was forced to replace almost all of the piping by May 1877, but during a new series of sea trials in the following month, the ship only reached .

Armament
Four muzzle-loading smoothbore  guns, based on the American Rodman design, were originally intended as Petr Velikys main armament, but the Russians were impressed by a demonstration of a new Krupp  rifled gun. They bought a few guns directly as well as a production license and an enlarged 12-inch, 20-caliber, gun was selected to replace the 20-inch guns. In order to keep the gun ports as small as possible the hydraulic turret machinery raised and lowered the guns' trunnions rather than their muzzles. They had a maximum elevation of +12.5° and a maximum depression of −2.5°. The gun turrets were of the Coles type and weighed  each. Powered by steam engines they could make a complete 360° rotation in one minute, although they had a firing arc of only 310°. The guns recoiled into the turrets after firing, which meant that a great deal of powder smoke was released into the turret. To counter this problem, ventilation fans were mounted in the turret roofs. The ship's machinery filled almost the entire breastwork, which forced the main gun magazines away from the turrets towards the ends of the ship, and that complicated the ammunition resupply arrangements for those guns. While some shells were stored in the breastwork, most were not, and likely would have slowed the ship's sustained rate of fire in a lengthy engagement.

A number of sources, including Campbell, claim that the ship suffered a number of cracks while firing the guns while ice-bound during the winter of 1877–78, but this incident cannot be confirmed by Russian-language sources. McLaughlin believes that any such incident would have been mentioned if it occurred, as such sources are otherwise quite candid about the ship's drawbacks.

The anti-torpedo boat armament of the Petr Veliky consisted of six four-pounder guns, four mounted on the bridge, and two at the stern, and two Palmcrantz one-pounder Gatling-type machine guns. They did not retract all the way into the hull, the excess length was hinged upwards and fastened to the bow. One spar torpedo was hinged on each side of the ship on a  boom that was extended until it was angled at 90° to the ship's side. Furthermore, two towed Harvey torpedoes were mounted at the rear of the ship. While Petr Veliky was not really maneuverable enough to make full use of these weapons, they were a formidable deterrent to other ships trying to ram.

Armor

It was backed by multiple layers of teak and iron, thought to be equivalent of another  of armor. The breastwork was also 14 inches thick, although the curved portions at the end of the breastwork were Hughes compound armor because very thick plates could not be bent easily. The compound armor consisted of two  plates separated by a layer of teak. This type of armor was also used to protect the gun turrets. Outside the breastwork, the ship's deck was armored with three 1-inch mild steel plates. The deck protection over the redoubt was either  or three inches thick: sources vary.

Service
Petr Veliky was built by the state-owned Galernii Island Shipyard in Saint Petersburg. Construction began on 1 June 1869, although her keel was not laid down until 23 July 1870. Launched on 27 August 1872, she entered service with the Baltic Fleet on 14 October 1876. She cost a then-staggering sum of over five and a half million rubles. Two 9-inch mortars were fitted on her quarterdeck during the war scare with Britain during the  Russo-Turkish War of 1877–78, but they were removed in 1880 without ever having been used in combat. Two frames for launching  Whitehead torpedoes were added to the ship's sides in that same year, but they proved ineffective.

Her original machinery proved unsatisfactory, and the Baird Works forfeited a payment of 254,000 rubles as penalty. The Imperial Russian Navy began to investigate replacing the ship's machinery in 1878, and a contract was finally signed with John Elder & Co., in Glasgow, Scotland, in October 1880, based on the Navy's favorable experience with the company's construction of the Imperial yacht . The ship did not reach the Scottish shipyard until 14 July 1881, and was refitting until February 1882. New vertical compound steam engines and twelve cylindrical boilers with a working pressure of  replaced the original defective machinery. The spar torpedoes in the bow were replaced by underwater torpedo-tubes for Whitehead torpedoes and the ship's propellers and rudder were also replaced. Her funnel was also reduced back to its original height. The new engine and boilers were slightly lighter than their predecessors, and the ship now displaced .

Immediately after her sea trials the ship departed Scotland for a Mediterranean cruise. Petr Veliky made port visits at Algiers, Athens, Corfu, Naples, La Spezia and Toulon before being recalled. She visited Cadiz, Lisbon, Brest, and Cherbourg before reaching Kronstadt on 12 September. The ship remained in the Baltic Sea for the rest of her career and had her light armament modified several times. During the 1880s her rear 4-pounder guns were replaced by two   and two others on her bridge were moved to the roof of the forward turret. Petr Velikys boilers were replaced in 1892, and by the mid-1890s the ship mounted two 4-pounder guns on each turret, six  5-barrel revolving Hotchkiss guns on the bridge and four  Hotchkiss guns.

Petr Veliky was considered obsolete by the late 1890s and a number of proposals were made to reconstruct her. The most elaborate scheme would have involved raising the turrets  and building a new armored casemate between the turrets and deck with six  guns. Despite saving  by substituting the lighter steel armor for the wrought iron, the ship would have gained  in displacement and her draft would have increased by about 12 inches. This plan was approved, albeit with a very low priority, and her turrets were removed in October 1898, but nothing more was done. On 11 June 1903 Admiral  F. K. Avelan,  Minister of the Navy, ordered that she be converted into a gunnery-training ship.

A new design was approved on 2 February 1904, although the Baltic Works in Saint Petersburg had already begun cutting the ship down to the berth deck. The side armor was removed and an entirely new superstructure  built. The boilers were replaced by twelve fire-tube boilers, ten refurbished ones from the Imperial yacht  and two new ones. The new boilers only supplied enough steam to give the engines , although a second funnel had to be added to accommodate their exhaust. Two masts were added with  fighting tops. The armament was almost entirely replaced with four 50-caliber 8-inch guns mounted in barbettes on the upper deck, sponsoned out over the sides of the ship, and six 45-caliber 6-inch guns were fitted in unarmored casemates on each side of the ship. The ship's anti-torpedo boat armament now consisted of twelve , four , eight 47-millimeter and two 37-millimeter guns.

The outbreak of the Russo-Japanese War of 1904-1905, almost as soon as her re-design was approved, meant that work on her slowed to a crawl, and did not resume until early 1907. The ship was completed the following year. Her displacement was now , almost  lighter than her modified displacement of 10,105 long tons. Her maximum speed was now , and she carried  of coal.

After her completion Petr Veliky was assigned to the Gunnery Training Detachment through 1917. A number of sources report that she was renamed by the Soviets as Respublikanets (Republican) or as Barrikada (Barricade), but this is not confirmed by the post-Cold War sources used by McLaughlin. That year she was assigned as a depot ship for submarines at Kronstadt and later Helsinki. The 1918 Treaty of Brest-Litovsk required the Soviets to evacuate their naval base at Helsinki in March 1918 or have their ships interned by newly-independent Finland - even though the Gulf of Finland was still frozen over. Petr Veliky reached Kronstadt in April in what became known as the "Ice Voyage". The ship was  hulked on 21 May 1921 and used to store  mines. She was renamed Blokshiv Nr. 1 (Hulk 1) on 4 December 1923, and forced aground in shallow water by autumn floods on 16 October 1925. She was not  refloated and repaired until 5 October 1927. On 1 January 1932 she was renamed to Blokshiv Nr. 4, and to BSh-3 on 16 May 1949, by which time she was being used as a barracks ship at Kronstadt. The ship was  stricken on 18 April 1959 and subsequently scrapped.

Notes

Footnotes

References

External links

 Article in Russian
 English article

Battleships of Russia
1872 ships
Battleships of the Imperial Russian Navy
Ironclad warships of the Imperial Russian Navy
Ships built at Admiralty Shipyard
Maritime incidents in 1925